The Gayle King Show is the name of several programs which have been hosted by Gayle King, friend and business associate of Oprah Winfrey.

Syndicated program
The first show to be called The Gayle King Show was a half-hour syndicated television show which lasted one season, running from 1997 to 1998.

Radio and OWN program
In September 2006, King began hosting a new program on Winfrey's XM Satellite Radio channel, which was also broadcast online; the show later moved to syndication on Westwood One.  On January 3, 2011, King began hosting an hour-long daily televised version of the radio show on OWN: Oprah Winfrey Network.

On November 10, 2011, King secured a deal with CBS to co-host the second incarnation CBS This Morning, the replacement of The Early Show, beginning on January 9, 2012. As a result, The Gayle King Show ended on November 17, 2011.

References

1997 American television series debuts
2011 American television series debuts
1997 American television series endings
2011 American television series endings
1990s American television talk shows
2010s American television talk shows
2006 radio programme debuts
2011 radio programme endings
2000s American radio programs
First-run syndicated television programs in the United States
English-language television shows
American talk radio programs
Syndicated radio programs
Westwood One
Radio programs on XM Satellite Radio
Oprah Winfrey Network original programming